Mały Szyszak (Czech Malý Šišák, German Kleine Sturmhaube, literally Small Helmet) is a mountain on the border between the Czech Republic and Poland. It is situated in the central (Silesian) part of the main mountain range of the Giant Mountains, right above the villages Przesieka and Špindlerův Mlýn.

It is separated from the mountain called Wielki Szyszak by Ptasi Kamień, Karkonoska Mountain Pass (Polish "Przełęcz Karkonoska"), Śląskie Kamienie, Czeskie Kamienie and Śmielec.

References

Mountains of Poland
Mountains and hills of the Czech Republic